The Beauronne is a 15 km long stream in the Dordogne department, France. It is a tributary of the river Isle. 

The name has a Celtic origin, and comes from bebros ("beaver") and ona ("river").

Geography

The river's source is in the commune of Église-Neuve-d'Issac, it runs through Les Lèches and empties into the Isle west of Mussidan.

References

Rivers of France
Rivers of Nouvelle-Aquitaine
Rivers of Dordogne